Stade Municipal is a multi-use stadium in Kpalimé, Togo.  It is currently used mostly for football matches and is the home stadium of Gomido.  The stadium holds 10,000 people.

Municipal
Kpalimé